Alain Plantefol (26 December 1942 – 23 June 2022) was a French rugby union player. He played second row for Racing CF, SU Agen, and the French national team.

Biography
Plantefol played his first international match against South Africa on 22 July 1967, and his final one against Wales on 22 March 1969. In 1967, he toured with the French team in South Africa while still playing for Racing CF.

Alain Plantefol died in Agen on 23 June 2022 at the age of 79.

Awards
Winner of the 1968 Five Nations Championship
Finalist in the Challenge Yves du Manoir (1970, 1975)
Winner of the 1975–76 French Rugby Union Championship

References

1942 births
2022 deaths
France international rugby union players
Racing 92 players
SU Agen Lot-et-Garonne players
Sportspeople from Colombes